Koritnik is a village in the municipality of Breza, Bosnia and Herzegovina.

Climate 
Koritnik has hot summers and cold winters with areas of higher elevation having short, cool summers and long, severe winters.

Demographics 
According to the 2013 census, its population was 781.

References

Populated places in Breza, Bosnia and Herzegovina